Ikatan Kampong Lurong Sekuna — Mulaut Ban 5 Football Club or simply IKLS-MB5 FC is a football club in Brunei, playing in the Brunei Super League. It takes its name from Kampong Lorong Sikuna in Peramu, Kampong Ayer, coupled with the Ban 5 section of Kampong Mulaut.

History
Ikatan Kampong Lurong Sekuna or Lurong Sekuna Village Union is an association that has existed since the early 1970s. The football club of its members registered officially as a society in 1988 to take part in district-level competitions. They reached the quarterfinals of the Pepsi Cup in 2001 and played in the Bruneian lower levels of the football pyramid in the early 00s.

In 2012, IKLS reached the semifinals of the Brunei FA Cup all the way from the first round despite playing in the district league. They also managed to finish fifth from their group in the 2011–12 National Football League and was placed in the 2014 Brunei Premier League. They won promotion to the 2015 Brunei Super League after finishing in second place, but was immediately relegated by occupying the second to bottom spot in the top flight. Shortly after a merger with Mulaut Ban 5 FC, they enjoyed another promotion after finishing runners-up in the 2017 Brunei Premier League and they have been a member of the Super League since.

Current squad

References

External links
 

Football clubs in Brunei
Association football clubs established in 1988
1988 establishments in Brunei